The 86th edition of the KNVB Cup (at the time called Amstel Cup) started on 9 August 2003. The final was played on 23 May 2004, with FC Utrecht beating FC Twente 1–0, lifting the trophy for the third time. A total of 88 clubs participated.

Teams
 All 18 participants of the Eredivisie 2003-04, six of which entering in the round of 16
 All 19 participants of the Eerste Divisie 2003-04
 48 teams from lower (amateur) leagues
 Two youth teams
 One professional clubs' second (reserve) team

First round
The matches of the first round were played on August 9, 12 and September 1, 2003.

<sub>E</sub> Eredivisie; <sub>1</sub> Eerste Divisie; <sub>A</sub> Amateur teams

Second round
The matches of the second round were played on September 23 and 25, 2003.

Third round
The matches of the third round were played on October 28 and 29, 2003.

Round of 16
The matches were played on December 16 and 17. Six Eredivisie clubs entered the tournament here, because they had been playing in the Champions League and the UEFA Cup.

<sub>E</sub> six Eredivisie entrants

Quarter-finals
The matches of the quarter finals were played on 3-4 February 2004.

Semi-finals
The matches of the semi-finals were played on March 16 and 17, 2004.

Final

FC Utrecht would play in the UEFA Cup.

See also
 Eredivisie 2003-04
 Eerste Divisie 2003-04

References
<references/>

External links
 Results by Ronald Zwiers  

2003-04
2003–04 domestic association football cups
2003–04 in Dutch football